Suspense is a 1913 American silent short film thriller directed by Lois Weber and Phillips Smalley. Weber also wrote the scenario and stars in the film with Valentine Paul. The film features early examples of a split screen shot and a car chase. The Internet Movie Database lists Lon Chaney as having an unconfirmed and uncredited brief role; however, this is disputed by silentera.com, which states "Despite attributions to the contrary, Lon Chaney does not appear in the film."

A print of the film is preserved at the film archive of the British Film Institute.
 In 2020, it was selected for preservation in the United States National Film Registry by the Library of Congress as being "culturally, historically, or aesthetically significant".

Plot

A servant leaves a new mother with only a written letter of notice, placing her key under the doormat as she leaves. Her exit attracts the attention of a tramp to the house. As the husband has previously phoned that he is working late, the wife decides not to ring back when she finds the note but does ring back when she sees the tramp. Her husband listens, horrified, as she documents the break-in and then the tramp cuts the line. The husband steals a car and is immediately pursued by the car's owner and the police, who nearly but don't quite manage to jump into the stolen car during a high-speed chase. The husband manages to gain a lead over the police but then accidentally strikes a man smoking in the road and checks to see that he is okay. Meanwhile, the tramp is breaking into the room where the wife has locked herself and her baby, violently thrusting himself through the wood door, carrying a large knife. At that moment the husband arrives, pursued by the police. As the husband runs towards the home, the police fire warning shots into the air, panicking the hobo. He runs down the stairs, to be met by the husband at the front door. After a short struggle, he overpowers the hobo, who is then grabbed by the police. The husband runs upstairs, everything is explained, and all is forgiven as the couple embrace.

Cast
 Lois Weber as The Wife
 Valentine Paul as The Husband
 Douglas Gerrard as The Pursuer
 Sam Kaufman as The Tramp

Lon Chaney connection
The film has been asserted as Lon Chaney's earliest extant film based on a brief scene in which a similar individual appears on camera. The documentary Lon Chaney: A Thousand Faces states that his film debut occurred after his wife's suicide attempt in April 1913 and that "his earliest films were made at the first studio to open in Hollywood, Nestor." Though well-known Chaney scholar Michael Blake's A Thousand Faces: Lon Chaney's Unique Artistry in Motion Pictures does note that the possibility exists of Chaney's performing in a role during a period of unemployment in 1912, it also notes that he rejoined Clarence Kolb and Max Dill's company in San Francisco, California, in September 1912. Blake specifically dismisses Chaney's appearance in Suspense in his book A Thousand Faces: Lon Chaney's Unique Artistry in Motion Pictures. Chaney website creator Jon C. Mirsalis originally attributed the appearance of the hobo who is struck by a car to Chaney but, after examining a high-resolution digital scan frame by frame, has recanted his earlier claim and now concedes that the individual is not Chaney.

Release
Suspense was released on July 6, 1913 by the Rex Motion Picture Company. A print of the film is preserved at the film archive of the British Film Institute. It was released on DVD/Blu-ray in 2018 in a box set called "Pioneers: First Women Filmmakers", with a new score by composer Skylar Nam.

See also
List of films featuring home invasions

References

External links

1913 films
1913 drama films
1913 short films
1910s thriller drama films
American silent short films
American thriller drama films
American black-and-white films
Films directed by Lois Weber
Films directed by Phillips Smalley
Surviving American silent films
Universal Pictures short films
United States National Film Registry films
1910s American films
Silent American drama films
Silent thriller films